Micah Sterling (November 5, 1784 Lyme, New London County, Connecticut – April 11, 1844 Watertown, Jefferson County, New York) was an American lawyer and politician from New York.

Life
Sterling graduated from Yale College in 1804. Then he studied law at Litchfield Law School, was admitted to the bar in 1809, and commenced practice in Adams, New York, but the same year removed to Watertown and continued the practice of law there. He married Betsey Bronson (1795–1831), and they had five children of whom only John C. Sterling (1820–1903) survived infancy.

Micah Sterling was Treasurer of the Village of Watertown in 1816, and was a director of the Jefferson County Bank. He was elected as a Federalist to the 17th United States Congress, holding office from December 3, 1821, to March 3, 1823. Afterwards he resumed the practice of law.

After the death of his first wife, he married Ruth Benedict (1801–1870), and their son was Lewis Benedict Sterling (1836–1899). Micah Sterling was a member of the New York State Senate (5th D.) from 1836 to 1839, sitting in the 59th, 60th, 61st and 62nd New York State Legislatures.

He died of scarlet fever on April 11, 1844, the same day as Egbert Ten Eyck who had succeeded him in Congress, and both were buried at the Brookside Cemetery in Watertown.

Congressman Ansel Sterling was his brother.

References

The New York Civil List compiled by Franklin Benjamin Hough (pages 71, 131f and 146; Weed, Parsons and Co., 1858)

External links
 

1784 births
1844 deaths
Litchfield Law School alumni
New York (state) state senators
People from Lyme, Connecticut
Politicians from Watertown, New York
Federalist Party members of the United States House of Representatives from New York (state)
Deaths from streptococcus infection
19th-century American politicians
Yale College alumni